St Aloysius Higher Secondary School (formerly St Aloysius English School) is a Catholic high school located in the District of Kollam in the Roman Catholic Diocese of Quilon. It was founded by the Congregation of Christian Brothers in 1896, with the main building completed in 1900.

In 1932 it had 23 lay teachers and 479 pupils.

This school is located near to Vaddy beach, Kollam around the corner from Vaddy Church.

Nearly 4000 students study in this institution, which was upgraded to senior secondary school.

The main subjects in Higher secondary section are science, computer science and commerce.

The High School is currently co-educational.

Notable alumni
C. Kesavan
Justice Bechu Kurian Thomas
Raja Vijayaraghavan V., Judge High Court of Kerala
Prem Dev M

References

External links
 Map showing St.Aloysius School in Kollam

Congregation of Christian Brothers secondary schools
Christian schools in Kerala
High schools and secondary schools in Kerala
Schools in Kollam district
Educational institutions established in 1897
1897 establishments in India